La Guayacana is a town in Tumaco Municipality, Nariño Department in Colombia.

Climate
La Guayacana has a very wet tropical rainforest climate (Af).

References

Nariño Department